Spoluka is a village in Ardino Municipality, Kardzhali Province, southern-central Bulgaria. It covers an area of 3.4 square kilometres and as of 2013 it had a population of 18 people.

Spoluka Point on Nordenskjöld Coast in Graham Land, Antarctica is named after the village.

References

Villages in Kardzhali Province